The Campeonato Nacional de Fútbol also called the Campeonato Nacional, it was an official Peruvian football competition created and then organized by the Peruvian Football Federation, it was played until the 1963 season. It was practically an interleague tournament, in which the provincial teams from the different departments that made up the Inca nation participated and also that depended on the Peruvian Federation. It was really the first great National Tournament held in football in Peru.

The champion received the Copa Presidente, donated by the President of the Republic Óscar Benavides.

Until the 1937 edition, the football players of the First Division teams belonging to those cities participated in the tournament representing Lima and Callao. Between the 1939 and 1944 editions both cities participated forming a single selection. In the following tournaments, the teams from Lima and Callao were made up of players from their respective amateur leagues.

Towards the mid-1960s, the tournament gradually lost interest from the fans due to the inclusion of clubs representing the teams from other regions of Peru, the Torneo Descentralizado were born in 1966, then with the project of Víctor Nagaro Bianchi, as head of the Consejo Nacional del Deporte equivalent to what is currently the Instituto Peruano del Deporte appointed in 1965 by President Fernando Belaúnde Terry during his first government, whose idea was to emulate the decentralized tournaments of that time in Italy and France where the entire country.

Champions

Titles by region

References

External links
Soccerway.com
Peruvian Football League News 

Football competitions in Peru
1928 in Peruvian football
Peru
Defunct sports competitions in Peru